Patrick Peter Sacco (October 23, 1928, Albion, New York – August 12, 2000, Ashland, Oregon) was an American composer and singer.

Sacco, under the tutelage of family members, was a traveling musician as a child, playing piano and performing as a soprano vocalist. He studied at Eastman Preparatory School during World War II, then received a bachelor's degree at SUNY-Fredonia in 1950. He then entered the military and studied while in Frankfurt under Wolfgang Niederste-Schee; he also performed on piano and organ and played clarinet as a member of the 4th Infantry Division band.

After military service, he returned to Eastman, where he obtained both master's and doctoral degrees and studied under Wayne Barlow, Howard Hanson, and Bernard Rogers. In 1959, he joined the faculty at San Francisco State University, remaining there until 1980; in 1970-71 he was visiting lecturer at the University of Hawaii.

Sacco performed as a tenor for many years and composed at least 200 works.

References
Michael Meckna, "Peter Sacco". The Grove Dictionary of American Music, 2nd edition. (rev. May 25, 2016, Oxford Music Online)

20th-century American composers
Singers from New York (state)
1928 births
2000 deaths
State University of New York at Fredonia alumni
20th-century American singers
American male composers
20th-century American male singers